Mazuca strigicincta, the Pikachu moth, is a moth in the family Noctuidae found from Nigeria and Ghana down to northern Namibia and Mozambique.

Taxonomy

Name 
This taxon was named by Francis Walker in 1866.

Common name 
The common name, Pikachu moth, comes from the fact that the moth shares colors with the popular Pokémon character Pikachu.

Appearances in media 
M. strigicincta appears on a commemorative Ghanaian postage stamp in 2002 along with other stamps featuring other species of moths. The stamp features the Pikachu moth with a purple background, with "Ghana" written in the top right and the characters "C4500" in the bottom left in red Comic Sans.

References

Moths described in 1866
Taxa named by Francis Walker (entomologist)
Noctuidae